Luís Leandro Castillo (born 12 February 1991) is an Argentine professional footballer who plays as a defender.

Career
Castillo started his career with Colón. Having come through their academy, Castillo was promoted into the Primera División club's senior squad for the 2012–13 season to make his professional bow on 16 March 2013 against San Lorenzo. He made fourteen appearances in his first season, before appearing twenty-five times in 2013–14 as they were relegated to the second tier. Instant promotion back was won in his third campaign, with him participating in thirteen matches as they finished top of Zone A. In July 2016, Instituto of Primera B Nacional signed Castillo. He netted his first goal in a September draw with Douglas Haig.

Instituto released Castillo in August 2017 after sixteen games and one goal for the club. On 16 March 2018, Castillo joined regional side Atlético Tala; he had trained with the team since January. Four months later, Castillo returned to Primera B Nacional with Gimnasia y Esgrima. His first appearance came on 6 October in an away match against Quilmes. He featured in a further five fixtures in 2018–19, before not playing at all in 2019–20 prior to being released at the end of the campaign.

Career statistics
.

References

External links

1991 births
Living people
Sportspeople from Entre Ríos Province
Argentine footballers
Association football defenders
Argentine Primera División players
Primera Nacional players
Club Atlético Colón footballers
Instituto footballers
Gimnasia y Esgrima de Mendoza footballers